Edward Harden may refer to:

 Edward Harden Mansion, historic home built in Sleepy Hollow, New York, in 1909
 Edward R. Harden (1815–1884), Nebraska and Georgia judge

See also
Edward Hardin (1922–2006), oil executive